Orgita is a settlement in Märjamaa Parish, Rapla County in western Estonia.

References

External links
Satellite map at Maplandia.com

Villages in Rapla County
Kreis Wiek